The Yuppie Fantasia is a 1989 Hong Kong comedy film written and directed by Gordon Chan, and storied, produced by and starring Lawrence Cheng based on the hit radio series of the same name created by Cheng and Chan Hing-ka for RTHK in 1986 which also starred Cheng. The film was followed by two sequels, titled Brief Encounter in Shinjuku released in 1990, and The Yuppie Fantasia 3 released in 2017.

Plot
Thirty-two year old Leung Foon (Lawrence Cheng) has been married for seven years, but looking back at his marital life, Foon and his wife Ann (Carol Cheng) seems to only have endless conflict. At the same time, while being shrouded under his more successful wife, Foon's self esteem is gradually hoarding day by day. Deciding to love a life being true man, Foon separates from Ann, channeling into the prelude of divorce.

Having just started a life of semi-freedom, Foon becomes intimate with his colleague's lover, Cora (Sheren Tang), in front of Ann due to a misunderstanding. Not long after, Leung gets a new tough boss in Mrs. Lam (Cherie Chung). Although stressful working under Mrs. Lam, Foon also cultivates subtle feelings with Lam. While still in an ambiguous relationship with Mrs. Lam, Foon's ex-girlfriend, Jenny (Elizabeth Lee), also comes back. Foon takes her in for kindness but not knowing that his career has reached rock bottom after his wife left him.

Cast
Lawrence Cheng as Leung Foon (梁寬), the main protagonist
Carol Cheng as Ann Hui (許鞍華), Foon's wife
Cherie Chung as Mrs. Lam (林太), Foon's superior
Sibelle Hu as Kwai, Pierre's wife
Elizabeth Lee as Jenny, Foon's first love
Leila Chow as Fung (阿鳳), Q Tai-long's wife
Sheren Tang as Cora, Pierre's lover
Peter Lau as Pierre (大古惑), Foon's friend
Manfred Wong as Q Tai-long (Q太郎), Foon's friend
Fei Fook
Alfred Cheung as Mr. Lam (林生), Mrs. Lam's ex-husband
Yip Hon-leung as Ronald, Ann's boss
Tung Nam
Lawrence Lau as Johnson, Ann's assistant
Chan Sau-hin
Kirk Wong as Solicitor Wong Yu-nam (黃與南律師)
Michael Lai as Insurance boss
Paul Chun as Mr. Chan (陳生), Ann's boyfriend
Vivian Chow as Fei-fei (菲菲), an admirer of Foon
Wong Man-piu as Real estate agent

Theme song
The Brink in the Dream (夢裡邊緣)
Composer: Lowell Lo
Lyricist: Susan Tang
Singer: Jacky Cheung

Box office
The film grossed HK$16,053,507 at the Hong Kong box office during its theatrical run from 20 May to 21 June 1989.

Accolades

Home media

DVD

VCD

Blu-ray

References

External links

The Yuppie Fantasia at Hong Kong Cinemagic

1989 films
Hong Kong comedy films
1980s screwball comedy films
Comedy of remarriage films
1980s Cantonese-language films
Golden Harvest films
Films directed by Gordon Chan
Films based on radio series
Films set in Hong Kong
Films shot in Hong Kong
1989 comedy films
1980s Hong Kong films